Hungarian grammar is the grammar of Hungarian, a Finno-Ugric language that is spoken mainly in Hungary and in parts of its seven neighboring countries.

Hungarian, a highly agglutinative language, uses various affixes, mainly suffixes, to change the meaning of words and their grammatical function. These affixes are mostly attached according to vowel harmony.

Verbs are conjugated according to definiteness, tense, mood, person and number. Nouns can be declined with 18 case suffixes, most of which correspond to English prepositions.

Hungarian is a topic-prominent language and so its word order depends on the topic-comment structure of the sentence (that is, what aspect is assumed to be known and what is emphasized).

Word order
Neutral Hungarian sentences have a subject–verb–object word order, like English. Hungarian is a null-subject language and so the subject does not have to be explicitly stated. Word order is determined not by syntactic roles but rather by pragmatic factors.  Emphasis is placed on the word or phrase immediately before the finite verb.

The four parts that a sentence usually contains are topic, focus, verb and the rest; however, any of the four parts may be empty. The topic and the rest may contain any number of phrases, but the focus may contain  only one phrase.

Emphasis
The tables below contain some Hungarian variations of the sentence János tegnap elvitt két könyvet Péternek. ("John took two books to Peter yesterday.") Besides the verb, the sentence contains four other elements: János ("John"), Péternek ("to Peter"), két könyvet ("two books") and tegnap ("yesterday").

The topic contains a phrase or phrases that the speaker considers to be known and are used to introduce the topic of the statement, equivalent to "as far as X is concerned,...". The focus attracts the attention to an element of the event that is considered to be unknown, or it may be a refutation to a possible opposing belief. It excludes the validity of the statement for all other individuals in question and is equivalent to "it was X and nothing else that...".

If a focus is present, the verbal prefix will be put after the verb (vitt el is used instead of elvitt). If there is no verbal prefix, there may be ambiguity in writing since the phrase before the verb may be either a topic or a focus. For example, in the sentence Éva szereti a virágokat ("Eve likes [the] flowers"), Éva may be a topic and the sentence may be neutral, or Éva may be a focus and the sentence may emphasize that it is Eve who likes flowers:

Morphology
Hungarian is an agglutinative language. Most grammatical information is given through suffixes: "at the table" = asztalon (space relation), "at 5 o'clock" = öt órakor (time relation). There is also one grammatical prefix (leg- for superlatives).

Overview of personal endings: typical sound elements
In Hungarian, the endings are common mostly for endings of pronouns with suffixes and postpositions, possessive endings of nouns and endings of verbs. (The accusative of pronouns is also given for comparison, but it is less regular.)

Harmonic vowels in suffixes
Front-back vowel harmony is important in Hungarian morphophonology. Certain suffixes also distinguish between front unrounded vowels and front rounded vowels. See Hungarian phonology or vowel harmony for a more detailed explanation.

Most (if not all) morphological word endings in Hungarian for verb conjugations (definite and indefinite), possessive suffixes and 'case-related' postpositions can be thought of as 'templates' that are, in turn, 'filled in' with vowels. While the template itself consists mainly of consonants (and sometimes vowels), the vowels that 'fill in' the template depend on the class of vowels (front, back, long, short, rounded, unrounded) in the word to which the template is attached.

For example, 'bVn' would be the template for the postposition meaning 'in' (with 'V' being the 'fill-in' vowel position) and it can be 'filled in' with either 'a' (for back vowels), thus forming 'ban,' or with 'e' (for front vowels), thus forming 'ben.' On the other hand, 'hVz' would be the template for the postposition meaning 'to' and this can be 'filled in' with 'o' (back), 'e' (front unrounded), or 'ö' (front rounded). The particular vowel or vowels taken by a template must mostly be memorized by a learner of Hungarian, but certain patterns can be noted by observing the particular phonological makeup of the consonants in the template. For example, 'vVl' is the template meaning 'with,' but the first consonant ('v') changes to match the final consonant of the word to which it is attached (provided the word ends in a consonant).

Note that the stem-final a and e, as well as o and ö in foreign words, are lengthened before suffixes: alma → almát, mese → mesét, pianó → pianót, Malmö → Malmőt. (Short o and ö cannot occur at the end of Hungarian words.) Short i, u and ü retain their length: ami → amit, kapu → kaput, menü → menüt.

Here are the vowels that form parallel pairs or triads in harmonic suffixes:

It can be seen the members of these pairs/triads agree mostly in height and length but differ in backness. (An exception is the pair á/é for which á (open front unrounded vowel) is considered to be back.)

In the cases of o vs. e and ö and of a and e there appears a difference in roundedness, too.

Notes:
e is used in two of the groups. There are no suffixes that have a/e/ö, and o/e (without ö) is very rare and is used only for certain second-person plural suffixes.
Whenever i is used in a suffix, it is usually an invariant suffix. It also occurs once as a front verb suffix (paired with -ja) and in the irregular forms neki and nekik (see Cases with personal suffixes).

Suffix typology
The suffixes can be classified into the following phonological types:
Initial consonant and no change depending on the stem ending: -ban/-ben, -hoz/-hez/-höz
Initial v with complete preservative consonant assimilation, only for -val/-vel and -vá/-vé
Initial vowel and no change depending on the stem ending: -ul/-ül, -ás/-és
Link vowel o/e/ö on stems ending with a consonant, with link vowel a for certain back-vowel noun stems, e.g. -om/(-am)/-em/-öm/-m
Link vowel a/e on stems ending with a consonant: -ak/-ek/-k
Link vowel u/ü on stems ending with a consonant: -unk/-ünk/-nk
Link consonant -j on stems ending with a vowel and on certain stems ending with a consonant, only for -a/-e/-ja/-je and -uk/-ük/-juk/-jük
Invariant: -kor, -ig

Minor variations:
-on/-en/-ön/-n does not use the a link vowel for any nouns
The accusative suffix, -ot/(-at)/-et/-öt/-t, does not use a link vowel for stems ending with certain consonants

Note that the long vowels á/é, ú/ű and ó/ő are not used as link vowels.

Citation form of suffixes
If the list of suffixes has only one invariant form, it is used on all stems: -ig.
If the list of suffixes has two forms, the former is the form for back vowel stems and the latter is the form for front vowel stems: -ban/-ben: -ban is used for lakás and -ben is used for szem and fürdő.
If the list of suffixes has three forms with the vowels o/e/ö, the o form is used for back vowel stems, the e form is used for front unrounded stems and the ö form is used for front rounded stems: -hoz/-hez/-höz: -hoz is used for lakás, -hez is used for szem and -höz is used for fürdő.
If the list of suffixes has forms that start with a vowel that are followed by one or more forms that start with a consonant, the forms that start with a vowel are used on consonant-final stems, and the forms which start with a consonant are used on vowel-final stems (the initial vowel of the suffix is called a link vowel, and the rules to select the form in the vowel or consonant group apply as above: -unk/-ünk/-nk: -unk is used on lakás, -ünk on szem and kör and -nk is used on fürdő.
If the list of suffixes has four forms for consonant-final stems, with the link vowels o/(a)/e/ö, the a form is used with certain back noun stems: -om/(-am)/-em/-öm/-m: -om is used for lakás, -am is used for ház, -em is used for szem, -öm is used for kör and -m is used for fürdő.

*: Its suffix may agree with any of the preceding variants, e.g. fürdőben but autóban, fürdőhöz but autóhoz and tévéhez.

Personal suffixes and link vowels
Personal suffixes can have various uses in Hungarian grammar. There are two sets of them: 
Type I uses the a/e set of vowels as link vowels
whereas Type II uses the o/e/ö set.
Therefore, their differences are:
 Type I has -a- as link vowel where Type II only uses -o in back-vowel words
 Type I doesn't use -ö- as link vowel with front-vowel words while Type II does.

In the example rows below the chart proper, the forms for the 1st person singular are given for the three basic types (back vowel, unrounded front vowel, rounded front vowel).
Within cells, the first row is for stems ending in a consonant and the second for stems ending in a vowel.
There is some variance with verbs (mostly in the 3rd person) but their forms still resemble this pattern.
The házam, mézem, földem group has another special feature as well: they always use a link vowel in the accusative, independently of their endings (e.g. házat but gázt, mézet but gézt).

This difference often disambiguates meanings, e.g. jöttek means "they came" (past) and jöttök means "you [pl.] come" (present).

An extreme example is the longest Hungarian word  'megszentségteleníthetetlenségeskedéseitekért' (means 'due to your repeatedly not being possible to be desecrated'). This word contains mass of inflexions, prefix, suffix, etc. The core of the word is 'szent', meaning "sacred."

Note: the accusative suffix following the stem or following other suffixes shows the same difference, except for the six different forms for the six persons:

Noun phrase 
See Hungarian noun phrase.

Postpositions
As well as the noun suffixes, which are often equivalent to English prepositions, Hungarian also has postpositions.

Amalgamation with personal pronouns
If postpositions are used with personal pronouns (cf. "to me"), most of them amalgamate with the suffixes expressing the person. Compare:

For the full list of such postpositions, see postpositions with personal suffixes.

Stand-alone postpositions
The following postpositions differ from the above in that they are never suffixed with personal endings:

Derived postpositions

Certain standard postpositions are derived from a noun + 3rd person singular possessive suffix + case ending, e.g. apám révén "by the help of my father". See their list here.

This internal structure affects how they are used with pronominal forms (see above).

Case requirements
Most postpositions govern the nominative case; the exceptions are listed below. (The genitive case below means that morphologically speaking, they can take either the nominative or the dative suffix, see Other noun endings.)

Postpositions functioning as prepositions
Some postpositions may also precede the noun, thus functioning as prepositions: át (over/across), keresztül (through), együtt (together with), szemben (opposite), túl (beyond), e.g. át a folyón or a folyón át ("across the river").

Adjectives and adverbs

Adjective marking
Adjectives are unmarked for case. Attributive adjectives are unmarked for number but predicative adjectives are marked: piros almák ("red apples") but Az almák pirosak. ("The apples [are] red.").

Adverb derivation
The suffix -an/-en/-n is used to form adverbs of manner from adjectives. -l, -lag/-leg and -ul/-ül are also used to derive adverbs from some adjectives.

There is also a suffix, -va/-ve, which is used to derive adverbs from verbs. Its nearest English equivalent is the -ing form in a present participle (rather than a noun):
Úszva jött ide. ("He came here swimming.")

When combined with a form of the existential verb (van), it expresses the result of an action:
A vacsora el van készítve ("The dinner is prepared."), from the verb elkészít ("prepare").

Such participles (note the adverbial usage) are referred to by term "adverbial participle" (distinguished from adjectival participle).

Use of adverbs
In Hungarian adverbs can be used predicatively with van ("is"): Korán van. ("It's early.") Nyitva van. ("It's open.")

Degree adverbs
Some degree adverbs are formed from adjectives. The suffixes are the same ones that are usually used on nouns:
-on/-en/-ön/-n, e.g. nagyon ("very")
-vá/-vé, e.g. kissé ("somewhat, to some extent"), eléggé ("quite, fairly")

Comparative and superlative
Comparative adjectives and adverbs are formed by adding -abb/-ebb/-bb to the adjective stem: gyors ("quick"), gyorsabb ("quicker"), gyorsan ("quickly"), gyorsabban ("more quickly").

To state the thing that is being compared with (like English "than"), Hungarian uses the noun suffix -nál/-nél or the preposition mint (mint is the only preposition in Hungarian): gyorsabb a szélnél or gyorsabb, mint a szél ("faster than the wind").

Superlative adjectives and adverbs are formed by adding the prefix leg- to the comparative: a leggyorsabb ("the quickest"), a leggyorsabban ("the most quickly").

Notes:
Back-vowel adjectives use a as link vowel (as in magasabb), while front-vowel ones use e (e.g. hidegebb "colder"). The only exception is nagy ("big"), which uses o as link vowel instead of a: nagyobb, legnagyobb, legeslegnagyobb.

The exaggerated measure is used to stress the superlative adjective.

Verbs 
See Hungarian verbs

Expressing time
Many expressions of time use the case endings and postpositions which are also used for position, e.g.:
-tól/-től – when from
-ig – until when
-ra/-re – by (before) a certain time
között (postposition) – between; among 
előtt (postposition) – before
után (postposition) – after
-n belül (postposition with suffix) – within

There are also some which are used only for time, e.g.:
-kor – at what time, e.g. kilenckor ("at nine"), karácsonykor ("at Christmas")
-onta/-ente/-önte – every ..., e.g. naponta ("daily")
múlva (postposition) – in ... time, e.g. 2 hét múlva ("in 2 weeks' time")

There are 2 ways of expressing how long ago something happened:
3rd singular possessive suffix with past tense, e.g. 10 éve költözött el. ("He moved away 10 years ago.")
-val/-vel + ezelőtt with past tense, e.g. 10 évvel ezelőtt költözött el. ("He moved away 10 years ago.")

Telling the time

 "Hány óra (van)? Mennyi (most) az idő?"  ( " What time is it? What is the time? ")

8.20 – Nyolc óra múlt húsz perccel.  "It is twenty (minutes) past eight."
8.50 – Tíz perc múlva kilenc óra. "It is ten to nine."

Times can be given by just the numbers, but this is not usual in speech, e.g.:

nyolc óra húsz (literally "eight hour twenty") or nyolc húsz (literally "eight twenty").

In speech the half and quarter hours are expressed by what fraction of the time to the next hour has elapsed.

These can be written using fractions, e.g.:
8.00 or 8 – nyolc (literally "eight") or nyolc óra ( literally "eight hours")
8.15 or  9 – negyed kilenc (literally "quarter nine")
8.30 or  9 – fél kilenc (literally "half nine")
8.45 or  9 – háromnegyed kilenc (literally "three-quarters nine")

These are abbreviated in movie programmes as n9, f9 and h9 (with the initial letters of the fraction names).

The times in between these are expressed in relation to the next or previous quarter hour, e.g.:
8.20 – negyed kilenc múlt öt perccel (literally "past quarter 9 by 5 minutes")...
...or fél kilenc lesz tíz perc múlva (literally "it will be half 9 in 10 minutes' time")
8.25 –  fél kilenc lesz öt perc múlva (literally "it will be half 9 in 5 minutes' time")

These are different when they refer to a time in the past or future:
8.20-kor – negyed kilenc után öt perccel (literally "after quarter 9 by 5 minutes")
8.25-kor – fél kilenc előtt öt perccel (literally "before half 9 by 5 minutes")

Duration structures
For a period of time extending up to the present:
3rd singular possessive ending with present tense, e.g. 3 éve lakom itt. ("I've been living here for 3 years.")
3rd singular possessive ending with negative past tense, e.g. 10 éve nem láttam. ("I haven't seen him for 10 years.")

For a period of time in the past, present or future:
accusative with dynamic verbs, e.g. 2 órát segítünk. ("We're helping for 2 hours."), 2 órát fogunk segíteni ("We're going to help for 2 hours."), 2 órát segítettünk. ("We helped for 2 hours.")
-ig with stative verbs, e.g. 5 évig laktam Londonban. ("I lived in London for 5 years."), Egy percig sem maradok itt! ("I won't stay here even for a minute!")
These two structures are often interchangeable.

The -ra/-re structure also exists, but it's rarely used in this sense since it may be ambiguous with the "by (before)" meaning. For example, Három napra ment el. ("He left for three days.") Then again: Három napot/napig volt távol. ("He was away for three days.") – the above suffixes appear.

Negation
Verbs are negated with nem except in the subjunctive, when ne is used.

Double or multiple negative is mandatory with negative pronouns (like nobody, nothing, never, nowhere).

Questions

Question words
Ki? is the basic question word for a person ("who?"), and mi? is the basic question word for a thing ("what?"). If it is meaningful, they can take the full range of case and noun suffixes: kit?, miben?, miképp? mi + ért ("for the purpose of") gives the question word miért? ("why?").

Milyen? is used to ask for a description and can be used either to ask about a whole noun phrase (Milyen a tanárod? "What is your teacher like?") or as a determiner (Milyen lakást akarsz? "What kind of flat do you want?"). There is no case suffix -lyan/-lyen, but that ending still occurs in ilyen ("this kind of"), olyan ("that kind of"), valamilyen ("some kind of") and semmilyen ("no kind of").

The strict three-way distinction in direction that occurs in the positional suffixes also occurs in the question words: hol? ("where?"), hova? /hová? ("where to?") and honnan? ("where from?").

Hány? is used to ask questions about numbers ("how many?"), and mennyi? is used to ask about quantities ("how much?"). If it is meaningful, they can take the full range of case and noun suffixes, and hánnyal?, hánykor?, mennyibe?, mennyiért? hány? can also take the full range of suffixes used for numbers and to express quantity: hányadik?, hányas?

Yes/no question
Yes-no questions are expressed by intonation and not by any modification to syntax or morphology.

A short positive answer to a yes/no question is often given by repeating the verb particle (or the full verb, if it has no particle), rather than by using the words Igen ("Yes"). Examples:
Elment? – El. ("Has he left? – He has." Literally "[He] away-went? – Away.")
 Látta a filmet? – Látta. ("Did he see the film? – He did." Literally "[He] saw the film? – [He] saw.").

A negative answer to a yes-no question may include the word Nem ("No"), the negation of the requested part of the sentence or both.
Elment?
Nem. (this option may sound rude) / Nem ment el. / Nem, nem ment el. ("No, he hasn't left." Literally "No, not [He] went away.")

Tag questions
Tag questions are made by adding ugye to the beginning or end of a statement: Elment, ugye? or Ugye elment? ("He has left, hasn't he?"). The latter form more strongly suggests a positive answer.

Subordinate and relative clauses
Subordinate clauses are often used with an antecedent in the main clause, e.g. Kabátot hozott, mert fázott. /Azért hozott kabátot, mert fázott. ("She fetched a coat because she was cold [not for some other reason].) 

Relative clauses usually have an explicit antecedent in the main clause, e.g. Attól félek/tartok, (hogy) nem mehetek el. ("I'm afraid [of the fact that] I can't go.")

References
 "The Hungarian Language: A Short Descriptive Grammar" by Beáta Megyesi (PDF document)
 Keresztes, László (1999). A practical Hungarian grammar (3rd, rev. ed.). Debrecen: Debreceni Nyári Egyetem. .
 Törkenczy, Miklós (2002). Practical Hungarian grammar: [a compact guide to the basics of Hungarian grammar]. Budapest: Corvina. .
 Törkenczy, Miklós (1999). Hungarian verbs and essentials of grammar: a practical guide to the mastery of Hungarian (2nd ed.). Budapest: Corvina; Lincolnwood, [Ill.]: Passport Books. .
 Rounds, Carol (2001). Hungarian: an essential grammar. London; New York: Routledge. .
Hungarian Language Learning References (including the short reviews of three of the above books)
Noun Declension Tables – HUNGARIAN. Budapest: Pons. Klett. 
Verb Conjugation Tables – HUNGARIAN. Budapest: Pons. Klett. 
Gyakorló magyar nyelvtan – A Practical Hungarian Grammar, Akadémiai Kiadó Budapest 2009

External links

 http://www.magyarora.com
 HungarianReference.com